The 1928–29 international cricket season was from September 1928 to April 1929.

Season overview

November

England in Australia

February

England in Jamaica

References

International cricket competitions by season
1928 in cricket
1929 in cricket